Dasia is a genus of lizards, commonly known as tree skinks or dasias, in the family Scincidae. The genus is endemic to Asia.

Species
The genus Dasia contains ten species which are recognized as being valid.
Dasia griffini  – Griffin's dasia
Dasia grisea  – big tree skink, grey dasia, grey tree skink
Dasia haliana  – Ceylonese dasia
Dasia johnsinghi  – barred tree skink
Dasia nicobarensis  – Nicobar dasia, Nicobar tree skink
Dasia olivacea  – olive dasia, olive tree skink
Dasia semicincta  – Peters's dasia
Dasia subcaerulea  – Boulenger's dasia, Boulenger's tree skink
Dasia vittata  – Borneo skink, striped tree skink
Dasia vyneri  – Shelford's skink

References

Further reading
Gray JE (1839). "Catalogue of the Slender-tongued Saurians, with Descriptions of many new Genera and Species". Ann. Mag. Nat. Hist., [First Series] 2: 331–337. (Dasia, new genus, p. 331; D. olivacea, new species, p. 331).
Harikrishnan S, Vasudevan K, De Silva A, Deepak V, Kar NB, Naniwadekar R, Lalremruata A, Prasoona LR, Aggarwal RK (2012). "Phylogeography of Dasia Gray, 1830 (Reptilia: Scincidae), with the description of a new species from southern India". Zootaxa 3233: 37–51. Preview. (Dasia johnsinghi, new species).

 
Lygosominae
Reptiles of Asia
Lizard genera
Taxa named by John Edward Gray